The Oklahoma secretary of transportation is a member of the Oklahoma Governor's Cabinet. The secretary is appointed by the governor, with the consent of the Oklahoma Senate, to serve at the pleasure of the governor. The secretary serves as the chief advisor to the governor on land, water, air and space traffic transportation needs and infrastructure.

The current secretary of transportation is Tim Gatz, a professional landscape architect with a bachelor's degree in landscape architecture, who was appointed by Governor Kevin Stitt in 2019.

History
The position of Secretary of Transportation was established in 1986 to provide greater oversight and coordination to the agricultural activities of the state government. The position was established, along with the Oklahoma Governor's Cabinet, by the Executive Branch Reform Act of 1986. The act directed the secretary of transportation to advise the governor on transportation needs and infrastructure policy and advise the state transportation agencies on new policy as directed by the governor.

Dual position
Oklahoma state law allows for cabinet secretaries to serve concurrently as the head of a state agency in addition to their duties as a cabinet secretary. Historically, the secretary of transportation has also served as either the director of the Oklahoma Department of Transportation or as the director of the Oklahoma Turnpike Authority. As of 2019, seven of the eight transportation secretaries have served in one of those dual positions, with three serving in all three.

Responsibilities
The secretary of transportation is responsible for the construction, maintenance, and regulation of state's transportation system. This infrastructure includes rail lines, state highways, state turnpikes, state seaports, state airports and state spaceports.

As of fiscal year 2011, the secretary of transportation oversees 3478 full-time employees and is responsible for an annual budget of over $1.9 billion.

Agencies overseen
The secretary of transportation oversees the following state agencies:

All numbers represented Fiscal Year 2011 levels

Salary
The secretary of transportation is one of the few cabinet secretaries whose annual salary is not set by law. As such, it is left to the governor to determine the position's salary through the annual budget. Despite this, if the secretary serves as the head of a state agency, the secretary receives the higher of the two salaries. What makes incumbent Secretary Gary Ridley's example unique is that he serves as both the head of the Transportation Department (ODOT) and the director of the Turnpike Authority (OTA). As such, he receives the salaries allowed to both positions.

List of secretaries

References

External links
 Members of the Governor's Cabinet
 State biography of Cabinet Secretary Gary Ridley

Transportation
Transportation, Secretary of